William or Bill Bailey may refer to:

Politicians
William Bailey (MP) (died 1409), MP for Salisbury
William J. Bailey (1807–1876), British-born physician and politician in the Oregon Country
William Henry Bailey (1831–1908), American author, lawyer, and statesman
William Gill Bailey (1833–1889), politician in Queensland, Australia
William Francis Bailey (1842–1915), American politician and judge
William Bailey Lamar (1853–1928), American politician and lawyer
William Bailey (Canadian politician) (1889–1975), member of the Legislative Assembly of Alberta, 1930–1935
William B. Bailey (1892–1977), American politician in the Massachusetts House of Representatives
Bill Bailey (Indiana politician) (born 1948), American businessman and politician
Billy Wayne Bailey (born 1957), former Democratic member of the West Virginia Senate
William Bailey (South Carolina politician) (born 1962), Republican member of the South Carolina House of Representatives

Sportsmen
William Heap Bailey (1847–1926), amateur footballer
William Bailey (cricketer, born 1870) (1870–1930), English cricketer
William Bailey (cricketer, born 1898) (1898–1983), Australian cricketer
Bill Bailey (outfielder) (1881–1967), Major League Baseball outfielder
William Bailey (cyclist) (1888–1971), British Olympic cyclist
Bill Bailey (pitcher) (1888–1926), Major League Baseball pitcher
Bill Bailey (American football) (1916–1990), American football player
Bill Bailey (surfer) (1933–2009), known as "the father of British surfing"
Billy Bailey (footballer), English footballer
Craig Bailey (William Craig Bailey, born 1944), Scottish footballer

Entertainers
William Bailey (actor) (1886–1962), American actor
Bill Bailey (dancer) (1912–1978), 1950s tap dancer and moonwalk pioneer
Bill Bailey (American actor) (born 1938), American actor and author
Axl Rose (born 1962), lead singer of Guns N' Roses, known as William Bailey when his mother changed his name after she remarried
Bill Bailey (born 1965), English comedian, musician and actor

Other people
Billy Bailey (Gunfight at Hide Park) (died 1871), lawman who was murdered
Frances Rachel Bailey, known as Billy Bailey, wife of Alfredo Quaglino
William Trist Bailey (1846–1910), developed land in Queens, New York City, c. 1878
 Sir William Bailey (engineer) (1838–1913), British engineer, businessman, and local politician
William Frederick Bailey (1857–1917), Irish lawyer and writer
William J. A. Bailey (1884–1949), Harvard University dropout who falsely claimed to be a doctor of medicine
William Bailey (soldier), British military officer
Buster Bailey (William C. Bailey, 1902–1967), American jazz musician
Bill Bailey (Spanish Civil War veteran) (1911–1995), Irish-American labor activist
William Bailey (Royal Navy officer) (1918–1985), British recipient of the George Medal
Billy Bailey (1947–1996), American convicted murderer
William H. Bailey (artist) (born 1930), American artist
William Bailey (trade unionist) (1851–1896), British trade unionist born in Saint Helena
William Shreve Bailey (1806–1886), Kentucky abolitionist and printer

Other uses
The Bill Bailey trilogy by Catherine Cookson
Cuthbert "Bill" Bailey, a character in Service with a Smile, a novel by P.G. Wodehouse
Bill Bailey, a character played by George Innes in the 1969 film The Italian Job
The uncle of George Bailey in It's a Wonderful Life (1946 film)
A character in The Match (film)
Will Bailey, fictional character in The West Wing
William Bailey, character in All Over Town
Bill Bailey, a supporting character in the stage musical Cats
No Matter How Much You Promise to Cook or Pay the Rent You Blew It Cauze Bill Bailey Ain't Never Coming Home Again, 2003 novel by Edgardo Vega Yunqué, called Bill Bailey for short
"(Won't You Come Home) Bill Bailey", song that inspired the novel

See also
William Hellier Baily, English palaeontologist
William Bayley (disambiguation)